Cosimo Bartoli (December 20, 1503 in Florence – October 25, 1572) was an Italian diplomat, mathematician, philologist, and humanist. He worked and lived in Rome and Florence and took minor orders. He was a friend of architect and writer Giorgio Vasari, and helped him to get his Vite ready for publication.

Life 
Bartoli worked in diplomatic circles, including as secretary to Cardinal Giovanni de’ Medici and as diplomatic agent for Duke Cosimo I. Bartoli wrote Ragionamenti accademici (Venice, 1567), which was mainly a criticism of Dante. One chapter, however, gave descriptions of composers and instrumentalists. He cited the composers Johannes Ockeghem and Josquin des Prez as equal to Donatello and Michelangelo in their respective arts, and stated that Ockeghem and Donatello were the precursors to Josquin and Michelangelo. In this book he also critiques architecture and painting, mainly focusing on the arts of his native Florence. He extolled the concept of invenzione in all the arts.

Works 
 

He also published a collection of translations of works by Leon Battista Alberti under the title Opuscoli Morali di Leon Batista Alberti, gentil’huomo firentino. Venice, 1568. These included:

Momo, ovvero del Principe
De’ discorsi de senatori, altrimenti Trivia
Dell’amministrare la regione
Delle commodità e delle incommodità delle lettere
Della vita di S. Potito
La cifra
Le piacevolezze matematiche
Della repubblica
Della statua
Della mosca
Del cane
Cento apologi
Hecatomphila
Deiphira

References
Clement A. Miller. "Cosimo Bartoli", Grove Music Online, ed. L. Macy (accessed March 18, 2006), grovemusic.com (subscription access).
Notes

1503 births
1572 deaths
Diplomats from Florence
Scientists from Florence